The Lagos Lawn Tennis Club (established 1895) is the oldest club in Nigeria. The Club which occupies approximately 14,000 square meters, is located at 12, Tafawa Balewa Square, in Lagos Island.

The Lagos Lawn Tennis Club plays host to several tennis tournaments with the Governor's Cup Lagos Tennis Championship (GCLT), an annual ITF Pro-Circuit competition with $100,000 prize money, being the most reputable.

See also
Olatunji Ajisomo Alabi
Lagos Yacht Club

References

1895 establishments in Lagos Colony
Sports clubs in Lagos
19th-century establishments in Lagos
Sports venues completed in 1895
History of Lagos
Lagos Island
Sports venues in Lagos
19th-century architecture in Nigeria